The 2009 Newcastle Knights season was the 22nd in the club's history. They competed in the NRL's 2009 Telstra Premiership and finished the regular season 7th (out of 16), reaching the play-offs for the first time since 2006. The Knights were then knocked out of the finals in the first week by the Bulldogs.

Season summary
The Knights won 9 consecutive games at EnergyAustralia Stadium, breaking the previous home record of 8. Season 2009 also saw coach Brian Smith sacked after announcing on July 19 that he had signed a four-year deal with the Sydney Roosters, and subsequently the team faltered as they lost three consecutive games until Newcastle officials dismissed Smith and appointed assistant coach Rick Stone. The season began well for the Knights with the side winning 7 of their opening 10 games and were sitting equal first with the Bulldogs, St. George Illawarra and the Gold Coast with 14 points. However, during the representative season, the Knights struggled and went through a bad period of 7 losses in 11 games, the last three losses were recorded after news broke of Smith's departure from the club. With Stone in charge, the Knights won 3 of their last 4 games to secure 7th place and a finals berth for the first time since 2006.

Match results

NRL Standings

2009 Squad

Sources 

NRL Draw
NRL Ladder
http://www.newcastleknights.com.au

Newcastle Knights seasons
Newcastle Knights season